Landmarks in Dalian, Liaoning, China, include:

Buildings and monuments 

Dalian Greenland Center
Dalian International Trade Center
Dalian World Trade Center
Dalian Futures Square 1
Dalian Zhoushuizi International Airport
Changhai Airport
Hongji Grand Stage
Dalian railway station
Dalian Sports Centre Stadium
Jinzhou Stadium
Olympia 66
Eton Place Dalian
Dalian Maple Leaf International School Senior High
Lushun South Road
Hongyanhe Nuclear Power Plant

Religious sites 

Dalian Mosque
Dalian Catholic Church
Beijing Street Church
Yuguang Street Church

Museums 

Jinzhou Museum (Dalian)
Lüshun Museum
Soviet destroyer Retivy (1939)

Schools 

Dalian University
Dalian Medical University
Dalian Jiaotong University
Dalian Polytechnic University
Dalian Institute of Chemical Physics
Dalian Minzu University
Dalian Institute of Science and Technology
Chinese Academy of Sciences
Dalian University of Technology
Dongbei University of Finance and Economics
Dalian University of Foreign Languages
Dalian Maritime University
Dalian Ocean University
Dalian Naval Academy
Liaoning University of International Business and Economics
Dalian No. 24 High School
Dalian No.8 Senior High School
Dalian Yuming Senior High School
Dalian Maple Leaf International School Senior High
Japanese School of Dalian
Dalian American International School (DAIS)
Liaoning Normal University

Parks and gardens 

Xinghai Square
Xinghai Park
Zhongshan Park (Dalian)
Zhongshan Square
Dalian People's Culture Club
Modern Buildings on Zhongshan Square in Dalian
Long Live the Victory of Mao Zedong Thought
Victory Square (Dalian)
People's Square
Dalian Discovery Kingdom
Longwangtang Cherry Blossom Park

Shopping, commercial, and industrial districts 

Dalian Software Park
Dalian Hi-tech Zone
Port of Dalian
Lüshun Port
Lüshunkou District
Xi'an Road Commercial Zone
Dalian Development Area
Qingniwaqiao

Natural 
Dalian Bay
Liaodong Bay
Changxing Island, Dalian
Qian Mountains
Dahei Mountain
203 Hill
Longwangtang Reservoir
Bingyu Valley

See also 

 Tourism in China
 Dalian

References 

Landmarks by city
Landmarks in China
Lists of tourist attractions in China
Buildings and structures in Dalian
Lists of landmarks